New York City FC II is an American professional soccer team based in New York City. It is the reserve team and minor league affiliate of New York City FC, and plays in MLS Next Pro, the third tier of the United States soccer league system.

History 
When NYCFC entered MLS in 2015, the league had no reserve competition. For their first few seasons NYCFC affiliated first with Wilmington Hammerheads FC and then with San Antonio FC but these partnerships were little used and the club continued with no minor league affiliate for several seasons afterwards.

MLS Next Pro 
On December 6, 2021 Major League Soccer announced the formation of a new league, MLS Next Pro, which would be a combination of a development league and a competitive tournament sitting on the third tier of the United States soccer league system. Amongst the teams listed as having signed up to participate in the first season was NYCFC. The name of the team – New York City FC II (mentioned as "NYCFC II") – was revealed when the club announced the signing of three players to stock the nascent team's roster. On February 24, 2022, it was announced that NYCFC II would play its home matches at Belson Stadium on the campus of St. John's University.

Players and staff

Roster

Technical Staff

Team Records

Year-by-year

Head coaches record

References

External links
 Official website

Association football clubs established in 2021
2021 establishments in New York City
Soccer clubs in New York City
New York City FC
New York City FC II
MLS Next Pro teams
Reserve soccer teams in the United States